Štangarske Poljane is a small settlement in the Municipality of Šmartno pri Litiji in central Slovenia. It lies in the valley of Reka Creek in the hills west of Šmartno. The municipality is now included in the Central Slovenia Statistical Region. The area is part of the traditional region of Lower Carniola.

References

External links
Štangarske Poljane at Geopedia

Populated places in the Municipality of Šmartno pri Litiji